Miletus biggsii, the Bigg's brownie, is a small butterfly found in India and Myanmar that belongs to the lycaenids or blues family.

Range
It is found in Kodagu (Coorg) in India, Myanmar, Thailand, Langkawi, Malaya, Tioman, Singapore, Borneo, Sumatra, Belitung and Weh.

Status
It is very rare in Kodagu (a single record) and rare in Myanmar as per Mark Alexander Wynter-Blyth.

Description
A small butterfly, 32 to 38 mm in wingspan. The upper forewing in both sexes has a broad white discal band which is straight, coalesced and comprises at least one-fourth of the wing.

Taxonomy
The butterfly was earlier known as Gerydus biggsii Distant. Eliot provisionally placed the single specimen from Kodagu in Miletus nymphis.

Subspecies
 Miletus biggsii biggsii (southern Burma, Thailand, Langkawi, Malay Peninsula, Tioman, Singapore, Borneo, Sumatra, Belitung, Weh)
 Miletus biggsii albotignula (van Eecke, 1914) (Simalur)
 Miletus biggsii natunensis (Fruhstorfer, 1916) (Natuna Islands)
 Miletus biggsii niasicus (Fruhstorfer, 1913) (Nias Island, Batu Island)

Notes

References

Print

Online

Miletus (butterfly)
Butterflies of Asia
Butterflies described in 1884
Butterflies of Singapore
Butterflies of Borneo